Club Deportivo Achuapa, is a Guatemalan football club based in El Progreso, Jutiapa Department. They compete in the Liga Nacional, the top tier of Guatemalan football. They now play their home games in the Estadio El Cóndor after moving there from the Estadio Municipal Manuel Ariza.

History
The club was founded in 1932 as Oriental Progresista. In 1974 they joined the Guatemalan League B.

They have spent the 2000/2001 season  at the highest level of Guatemalan football, playing in the Liga Nacional de Guatemala. They have been playing in the Primera División Group "A" or "B" until getting promoted back to the Liga Nacional in 2020.

Honours

Domestic competitions

League
Primera División de Ascenso
Winners (1): Apertura 2019

Segunda División de Ascenso
 Winners (1): Clausura 2018

Friendly Tournaments
Copa La Fraternidad
 Winners (1): 2023

Current squad

Notable former players
  Álvaro Garcia
  Juliano Rangel
  Rafael da Roza
  Marlon Negrete
  Alexis Libonatti
  Nicolas Martínez 
  Roberto Nurse
  Jorge Estrada
  Brandon Dávila
  Hamilton López
  Oliver Rodas

Managerial history
  Ricardo Carreño (2000–2001)
  Irving Olivares (2019-2020)
  Iván León (2020-2021)
  Sergio Pardo (2021)
  Rafael Díaz (2021)
  Gustavo Machaín (2021)
  Raúl Arias (2021-2022)
  Adrián Arias (2022)
  Ramón Maradiaga (2022-2023)
  Raúl Arias (2023- )

References

Football clubs in Guatemala
Association football clubs established in 1932
1932 establishments in Guatemala